Glenn Bell is a former Scotland international rugby league footballer who played in the 1980s and 1990s.

Background
Bell was born in New Zealand. He is of Scottish descent.

Playing career
Bell played for the Manukau Magpies, and is a member of the wider Bell family. He Played in England for a large majority of his career but he made a name for himself playing for various Auckland semi professional club sides. Glenn was a very respected player known for his defensive efforts.

Representative career
He won a cap for Scotland while at Dewsbury Rams in 1997 against France.

County Cup Final appearances
Glenn Bell played right-, i.e. number 10, (replaced by interchange/substitute Alan Dakin) in Featherstone Rovers' 14-20 defeat by Bradford Northern in the 1989–90 Yorkshire County Cup Final during the 1989–90 season at Headingley Rugby Stadium, Leeds on Sunday 5 November 1989.

References

1965 births
Living people
Dewsbury Rams players
Doncaster R.L.F.C. players
Featherstone Rovers players
Manukau Magpies players
New Zealand people of Scottish descent
New Zealand expatriate sportspeople in England
New Zealand rugby league players
Place of birth missing (living people)
Rugby league props
Rugby league second-rows
Scotland national rugby league team players